Andrea Ferrigato (born 1 September 1969 in Schio) is an Italian former road bicycle racer. In 2020 he achieved a notable sub3 Argus result from the unseeded menagerie of 4F at the Cape Town Cycle Tour.

Career 
In 1991 he was a professional with the shirt of Ceramiche Ariostea and he rode for this team until 1993. In 1994 he won the Kranj stage at Giro d’Italia, while his best year was 1996, wearing the shirt of Roslotto-ZG Mobili. In that year he won the Leeds International Classic and the Gran Prix of Switzerland and placed second (126 scores) in the World Championship, after Johan Museeuw (162 scores).

During some years he was in the Italian national team, and participated in two editions of the road world championship. He rode a season for the team Acqua&Sapone and then he left in March 2005, when he began to work for the company Selle Italia.

Since 2011 he has been working for the tour operator Girolibero, specialized in cycling holidays, where he has been planning roadbike tours and creating the brochure Girolibero Roadbike http://www.roadbike.girolibero.com/en/.

Major results

1991
1st, Giro della Provincia di Reggio Calabria
1994
1st, Stage 12, Giro d'Italia
1995
1st, GP Industria & Artigianato di Larciano
1996
1st, Giro della Romagna
1st, Trofeo Matteotti
1st, Leeds Classic
1st, Züri-Metzgete
2nd, UCI Road World Cup
1997
1st, GP Ouest France-Plouay
1st, Stage 5, Tirreno–Adriatico
1999
1st, Trofeo Pantalica
1st, Stage 2, Four Days of Dunkirk
1st, Overall, Tour de Berne
2001
1st, Overall, Volta ao Algarve
2002
1st, Stage 2, Étoile de Bessèges
2003
1st, Stage 1, Giro della Liguria
1st, Gran Premio Nobili Rubinetterie
2020
742nd, Overall, Cape Town Cycle Tour

External links 

Palmarès by cyclingbase.com 

1969 births
Italian male cyclists
Living people
Italian Giro d'Italia stage winners
People from Schio
Cyclists from the Province of Vicenza